Lahori Gate may refer to:
 Lahori Gate, Delhi, an entrance to the Red Fort in Delhi, India.
 Lahori Gate, Lahore. one of the 13 gates of the Walled City of Lahore
 Lahori Gate (TV series), a Pakistani comedy drama serial that aired on PTV Home

See also
 Delhi Gate (disambiguation)
 Kashmiri Gate (disambiguation)